The Bangladesh National Film Award for Best Dialogue is one of the most honourable film awards in Bangladesh. Since 1978, the awards have been given for best dialogue. The first award winner was Subhash Dutta.

List of winners

See also
 Bangladesh National Film Award for Best Film
 Bangladesh National Film Award for Best Story

References

Bangladeshi film awards
Awards established in 1977